The 2022 season was the Dallas Cowboys' 63rd in the National Football League (NFL) and their third under head coach Mike McCarthy.

This was the first season since 2014 without offensive tackle La'el Collins on the roster, as he was released on March 18, 2022, and later signed with the Cincinnati Bengals. Despite losing to the Jacksonville Jaguars in Week 15, the Cowboys clinched a playoff berth after a loss by the Washington Commanders later that day. This marked the first time since 2006–2007 the Cowboys qualified for the postseason in consecutive seasons. After the Philadelphia Eagles beat the New York Giants in Week 18, the Cowboys failed to repeat as NFC East champions, extending the NFC East's repeat winner drought to 18 seasons. Their own loss to the Commanders that same day meant the Cowboys tied the previous year's 12–5 record.

In the wild-card round of the playoffs, the Cowboys defeated the Tampa Bay Buccaneers to win their first road playoff game since their Super Bowl-winning 1992 season, and ended their winless streak against Tom Brady in what proved to be Brady's last game in his career. However, they were defeated by the San Francisco 49ers for the second consecutive season, this time in the divisional round, their seventh consecutive divisional round defeat.

Offseason

Signings

Re-signings

Departures

Draft

Draft trades

Staff

Rosters

Opening preseason roster

Week one roster

Final roster

Preseason
The Cowboys' preseason opponents and schedule was announced in the spring.

Regular season

Schedule

Note: Intra-division opponents are in bold text.

Game summaries

Week 1: vs. Tampa Bay Buccaneers

Despite a strong defensive effort, the Cowboys could not keep pace against Tom Brady and the Tampa Bay Buccaneers, and failed to find the end zone in their season opener. The 19–3 loss dropped Dallas to 0–1 on the season and 0–7 all time against Brady-led teams. The three points were also the Cowboys' lowest total for a season opener since the infamous 1989 season, when they were shut out by the New Orleans Saints. Worsening matters further, quarterback Dak Prescott injured his right hand late in the fourth quarter, which was revealed after the game to be a thumb fracture. Cowboys owner Jerry Jones announced immediately after the game that Prescott would undergo surgery the following day, sidelining him for several weeks. Backup quarterback Cooper Rush was announced as the starter for Dallas in Prescott's absence.

Week 2: vs. Cincinnati Bengals

The Cowboys hosted the Bengals hoping to avoid their first 0–2 start since 2010. The Cowboys entered the game as 7-point underdogs without Dak Prescott. The Cowboys led 17–3 at halftime, though they allowed the Bengals to tie the game at 17. The Cowboys defense gave Joe Burrow and the Bengals a hard time throughout the game, as Micah Parsons registered multiple sacks on Joe Burrow. In the final minutes of the game, the Cowboys forced the Bengals to punt, and drove the ball to field goal range. In the fading seconds, Brett Maher kicked a game winning field goal to help the Cowboys stave off the Bengals comeback to improve to 1–1.

Week 3: at New York Giants

The Cowboys led 6–3 at half but missed opportunities to blow the game open. Even though they blocked a Giants field goal attempt, referees missed a defensive pass interference call which would have given the Cowboys a 1st and Goal on the 1-yard line, and CeeDee Lamb uncharacteristically dropped a big catch that could've been a touchdown. The Giants got the ball to start the third quarter and scored on their first two drives, the second a touchdown run by Saquon Barkley to give the Giants a 13–6 lead. The Cowboys responded with a touchdown run by Ezekiel Elliott, then stopped the Giants on 4th down the next drive. On their next drive, Lamb converted on a 4th and 4 and finished the drive with a one-handed touchdown catch to take a 20–13 lead. The Cowboys forced a three-and-out and started their next drive in field goal range to make it a two-score game after a big punt return. The Giants responded with a field goal to cut the deficit and had a chance to tie the game, but Trevon Diggs sealed the win with his first interception of the season.

DeMarcus Lawrence finished with 3 sacks on the night, and the Cowboys defense had 5 total. The Cowboys improved to 2–1, and Cooper Rush became 3–0 as the Cowboys starting quarterback.

Week 4: vs. Washington Commanders

Week 5: at Los Angeles Rams

Week 6: at Philadelphia Eagles

The Cowboys traveled to Philadelphia, looking to continue their momentum and hand the undefeated Eagles their first loss. Following a scoreless first quarter, Philadelphia scored first on a Miles Sanders touchdown run for a 7–0 lead. Cooper Rush was intercepted by Chauncey Gardner-Johnson on the first play of the ensuing drive, and the Eagles doubled their lead seven plays later on an A. J. Brown touchdown reception. The Eagles added two field goals following a Cowboys' three-and-out and another interception to make the score 20–0. This time, the Cowboys finally rebounded, as KaVontae Turpin returned the kickoff after the second field goal to the Eagles' 41. Rush threw a pass to Noah Brown in the endzone for a touchdown, but the play was reversed after Brown was deemed to have landed out of bounds. The Cowboys settled for a Brett Maher field goal, cutting the deficit to 20–3. Dallas sprung to life in the second half, getting a defensive stop against the Eagles and following it up with a quick scoring drive culminating in a 14-yard touchdown run by Ezekiel Elliott. The defense stopped Philadelphia again, and the offense again put together a scoring drive, capped by a 7-yard touchdown reception by Jake Ferguson to pull within three points. However, this was the closest the Cowboys would get to the Eagles, as Philadelphia answered with a long drive of their own, culminating in a 7-yard touchdown catch by DeVonta Smith, making the score 26–17 following a failed two-point conversion. Rush threw his third interception of the night four plays later, allowing the Eagles to burn more time off the clock before punting back to the Cowboys. Needing a touchdown and a field goal to take the lead, Dallas drove to the Philadelphia 41, but a 59-yard field goal attempt by Maher sailed wide right, sealing the Cowboys' fate. Dallas dropped to 4–2 with the 26–17 loss, and fell to third place in the NFC East thanks to the New York Giants winning earlier that day. This was Cooper Rush's first career loss as a starter after beginning his career with a 5–0 record.

Week 7: vs. Detroit Lions

In Dak Prescott's first game back from a thumb injury, the Cowboys initially slumped by trailing 6–3 at halftime. The Cowboys blew the game open after a key fumble in the Lions' red zone, but forced another punt. The Cowboys defense forced five turnovers as the Cowboys dominated the remainder of the game. The Cowboys marched down the field in the fourth quarter after forcing a fumble by the Lions at the Dallas 1-yard line, denying the Lions a touchdown. Dak Prescott finished the game with his first touchdown pass of 2022. The Cowboys improved to 5–2, but remained in third place in the NFC East because the Giants also won their game that day.

Week 8: vs. Chicago Bears

Despite a weak defensive performance and the absence of Ezekiel Elliott, the Cowboys were superior to the Bears, who were just coming off an upset win against the Patriots. The Cowboys exploded in the first quarter, already going up by 14. The two teams exchanged two touchdowns to make the game 28–14. Shortly before halftime, an interception led to the Bears cutting the lead further. The Cowboys defense continued to struggle, as they left the game open after a fumble play was reversed. After the Bears cut the Cowboys lead to 28–23, the Cowboys offense marched down the field to pull their lead back up to make it 35–23. After several plays, Micah Parsons scored his first NFL touchdown after recovering a fumble untouched to give Dallas a 42–23 lead. The Cowboys and the Bears repeated exchange of touchdowns, with the Bears getting one but failing a two-point conversion attempt, and the former opting to converting an extra point, making the score 49–29. That was also the final score. This was Bears head coach Matt Eberflus' first return to Dallas in 5 years. Eberflus previously served as the Cowboys' linebackers coach and passing game coordinator from 2011–2017 under then-head coach Jason Garrett. The win not only improved the Cowboys to 6–2, but also moved them up to second place in the NFC East following a Giants loss to the Seahawks later that day.

Week 10: at Green Bay Packers

This was head coach Mike McCarthy's first return to Lambeau Field since his firing from the Packers late in the 2018 season. McCarthy previously served as Green Bay's head coach from 2006–2018, leading them to 9 playoff appearances and to the franchise's fourth Super Bowl title in Super Bowl XLV. The Cowboys blew a 28–14 lead and lost to Aaron Rodgers and the Packers, 31–28, in overtime, on a 28-yard field goal by Mason Crosby, resulting in their first ever loss after leading by 14 going into the 4th quarter.  They were previously 195–0 in those circumstances. With the upset loss, the Cowboys fell to 6–3, and third in the NFC East after the Giants won earlier in the day.

Week 11: at Minnesota Vikings

The Cowboys demolished the Vikings on both sides of the ball. In Ezekiel Elliott's first game back from his knee injury, Elliott combined with Tony Pollard for four touchdowns against a Vikings team that had been rolling with a 7-game win streak. The Cowboys improved to 7–3 with this win, and the New York Giants' loss to the Detroit Lions earlier that day moved the Cowboys to second place. The Cowboys were the only team to defeat the Vikings at U.S. Bank Stadium during the season, as the Giants lost the final game at U.S. Bank Stadium in Week 16.

Week 12: vs. New York Giants
Thanksgiving Day games

Despite a rocky first half, the Cowboys dominated the rest of the way. This was the Cowboys' first Thanksgiving Day win since 2018, and the Cowboys improved to 8–3 on the season. For the first time since 2012, the Cowboys wore their classic throwback uniforms, thanks to the NFL rescinding the one-helmet rule.

Week 13: vs. Indianapolis Colts

Week 14: vs. Houston Texans

The Cowboys stayed at home to take on the Houston Texans, whose lone win prior to Week 16 came against the Jacksonville Jaguars in Week 5. The Cowboys jumped to an opening touchdown drive from Tony Pollard to allow the Cowboys to take an early 7–0 lead. The Texans responded with a touchdown drive of their own to make it 7–7. The Cowboys trailed 10–7 after the first quarter, then regained the lead after Tony Pollard had another touchdown drive to make it 14–10 Cowboys. The Texans took the lead again after a touchdown drive from Jeff Driskel to Amari Rodgers. The two teams exchanged field goals before halftime, making the game 20–17 in favor of the Texans. In the third quarter, the Cowboys allowed the Texans to march down the field, but were able to hold Houston to a field goal. In the final quarter, the Cowboys trailed 23–20. In the final minutes of the game, the Cowboys forced a turnover on downs on 4th-and-goal on the 3-yard line via a combined tackle made by Neville Gallimore and Anthony Barr to get the ball back to get another chance to avoid embarrassment. The Cowboys moved into the red zone of Houston territory prior to the two-minute warning, and put the Cowboys in position to take a late lead. Dallas did so via an Ezekiel Elliott 2-yard rushing touchdown to give the Cowboys a 27–23 lead with 41 seconds left in the game. The Texans tried to respond, but Cowboys' cornerback Israel Mukuamu, who substituted for injured Anthony Brown, intercepted a Hail Mary pass to seal the Cowboys' win. The win improved the Cowboys to 10–3, giving Dallas back-to-back 10+ win seasons for the first time since 1995–1996.

Week 15: at Jacksonville Jaguars

The Cowboys traveled to Jacksonville for the first time since 2006. The Cowboys blew a 27–10 lead and lost to Trevor Lawrence and the Jaguars, 40-34 in overtime, on a 52-yard pick-six by Rayshawn Jenkins. With the upset loss, the Cowboys fell to 10–4, and 0–2 all time in the city of Jacksonville. Fortunately for Dallas, they still clinched their second consecutive playoff berth thanks to the Washington Commanders' loss to the New York Giants later that night.

Week 16: vs. Philadelphia Eagles

The Cowboys returned home to face the league-leading Philadelphia Eagles, seeking to keep their hopes of repeating as NFC East champions alive. On Dallas' first drive, Dak Prescott set the longest interception streak of his career, after Eagles' Josh Sweat intercepted him, and returned that same interception for a touchdown, putting Dallas in an early 10–0 hole. Despite this early deficit, and facing a deficit for most of the game, the Cowboys responded in dominant fashion, torching Philadelphia's high-ranked defense for over 400 total yards. Prescott rebounded from the pick six with his best game of the season, throwing for 347 yards and three touchdowns, including two to CeeDee Lamb, who finished with 120 yards receiving. The defense contributed to Dallas' comeback as well, forcing four turnovers that led to 20 points for the Cowboys, helping them keep pace with the Eagles, and eventually putting Dallas in the lead for good. With the 40–34 win, Dallas improved to 11–4 on the season and kept their division title hopes alive, while simultaneously denying Philadelphia a chance to finish with a perfect away record. The victory, coincidentally, was a reversal of the Cowboys' loss to Jacksonville the prior week, with the final score being 40–34 with the winner erasing a deficit of 10 or more points. The Cowboys' win also marked their fifth straight home win over their rivals and their eighth straight home win in 2022 after the Week 1 loss to Tampa Bay.

Week 17: at Tennessee Titans

Despite a first half funk, the Cowboys defense held the Titans offense to 13 points. Tennessee was already without starting quarterback Ryan Tannehill for the season due to injury. As the interception streak went on for Dak Prescott, the Cowboys stayed afloat after another solid second half. The Cowboys improved to 12–4, and sent the Titans to their first losing season in seven years.

Week 18: at Washington Commanders

Standings

Division

Conference

Postseason

Schedule

Game summaries

NFC Wild Card Playoffs: at (4) Tampa Bay Buccaneers

The matchup with the Buccaneers saw the Cowboys buck a negative history trend, as the Cowboys won their first road playoff game since 1992, as well as improving to 1–7 against Tom Brady-led teams. It also marked Dallas' first playoff win in their navy blue jerseys since the 1978 season, when they shut out the Los Angeles Rams in the NFC Championship game.

Kicker Brett Maher notably missed 4 extra points, the most ever in an NFL game.

NFC Divisional Playoffs: at (2) San Francisco 49ers

References

External links
 

Dallas
Dallas Cowboys seasons
Dallas Cowboys